Nordic Cup may refer to:
 Alpine Nordic Cup, circuit of alpine skiing competitions in the Nordic countries
 Nordic Cup (1994), a football competition for national teams from the Nordic countries staged during summer 1994
 Nordic Cup (football), 1959–62 club competition for Nordic countries football clubs
 Nordic Cup (rugby league), rugby league competition for national teams from the Nordic countries
 Nordic Cup (women's football), a football competition for women's under-23 national teams from the Nordic countries and invited teams
 Nordic Cup for Juniors, a youth football competition for national teams from the Nordic countries and invited teams
 Nordic Futsal Cup, a futsal competition for national teams from the Nordic countries
 Rugby Nordic Cup, club competition for Nordic countries rugby union teams